Madinat al-Baath, also known as City of Baath or New Quneitra, is a town in the Golan Heights that is the administrative centre of the Quneitra Governorate of southern Syria. It is located on the Damascus–Quneitra road, 12 km north of Quneitra and 2 km west of the town of Khan Arnabah. It is a planned town, founded and first settled in 1986, and replaced Quneitra city as the provincial centre, after Quneitra was destroyed and abandoned. It has an area of 1.9 km² and a height of 900 meters above sea level. According to the 2010 official estimate, Madinat al-Baath has a population of 4,500. The town is named after the ruling Syrian Ba'ath Party.

The town has a well-developed infrastructure, including 22 km of roads, banking services, government and non-government organizations, TV and radio station, cultural centre, football stadium, hospital, etc. In December 2013, the construction of 5 new faculties of the Damascus University was launched by the town council of Madinat al-Baath.

The residents of the town are mainly involved in agriculture and services.

References

Towns in Quneitra Governorate
Syria articles missing geocoordinate data
1986 establishments in Syria